Geilebach (in its lower course: Mombach) is a small river of Hesse, Germany. It flows into the Ahne in Kassel.

See also
List of rivers of Hesse

Rivers of Hesse
Rivers of Germany